The Ordos campaign of 1592, also called the Ningxia campaign or Pubei rebellion, was a rebellion against the Ming dynasty by Liu Dongyang and Pubei, a Chahar Mongol who had previously submitted to the Ming, and its suppression.

Background
Pubei submitted to the Ming dynasty and brought with him 100 followers. He eventually became a military commissioner of Huamachi near Ningxia, and more promotions and rewards from the court followed, despite official complaints of unruliness caused by Pubei and his sons. In 1589 Pubei was promoted to regional vice commander of Ningxia and his son Bo Cheng'en took up his old post. At this point he had with him 3,000 personal retainers and wished to retire, handing over the post to his son. However Grand Coordinator Dang Xin refused the transfer of power. Over the next three years Pubei and Dang Xin clashed over a number of issues. Dang refused to supply Pubei's personal retainers on the grounds that they weren't in the employ of the government, and therefore not eligible for government support. Dang also flogged Bo Cheng'en in public, apparently for attempting to steal another official's wife. Following that, he ordered the arrest of Pubei's followers after their return from a campaign to the northwest.

Pubei followed government protocols and tried to seek redress from the government, but this only angered Dang more.

In March 1592 a Han officer called Liu Dongyang mutinied and killed Dang Xin. They seized some 47 fortresses in the outlying area and demanded autonomy from the Ming government or else they would ally with the Ordos Mongols.

News of the rebellion reached the court on 19 April 1592.

Battle
Wei Xueceng was invested with full authority by the Wanli Emperor and dispatched commanders to defend the south bank of the Yellow River.

The border fortresses were retaken within a few weeks until only Ningxia was left. However at this point Wei complained that he did not have the necessary manpower or resources to take the city. He lobbied for a peaceful solution to the crisis.

The stalemate lasted for six weeks. Ming forces entrenched themselves around Ningxia but were continuously harassed by Mongol horsemen. An attempted assault on the city resulted in the defeat of 3,000 rebels and the recovery of some military equipment, but Ming forces were unable to breach the city defenses, suffering heavy casualties.

Mongol forces raided nearby cities and cut off the Ming supply lines, encircling the entrenched Ming positions.

Li Rusong and Ye Mengxiong were called in to resolve the situation. Ye Mengxiong arrived at the nearby city of Lingzhou on 14 July with 400 cannons, fire carts, and a contingent of Miao troops from the southwest. The Ming divided their forces into five armies, four for each gate, and a mobile corps under Ma Gui. Two weeks later Pubei's men sallied out and engaged in battle with Ma Gui. Both sides suffered heavy losses, but Pubei was repelled with cannon fire. Apparently the rebels' Mongol allies were supposed to attack from the rear during the battle but they refused.

Li Rusong and Mei Guozhen arrived by the end of July and bombarded the city walls with cannon fire which did nothing. On 2 August, Li Ruzhang, Li Rusong's brother, attempted to scale the walls with ladders but failed. On 3 August, Gong Zijing attacked the south gate with Miao troops while Li Rusong tried to scale the walls, but they were repelled by arrows and cannon fire. They tried again in the night but failed again.

The Wanli Emperor grew frustrated with the situation and dismissed Wei Xueceng, replacing him with Ye Mengxiong. A new plan to flood the city was approved and the army began constructing dikes around Ningxia. The dikes were completed 23 August. Pubei tried to send for help, but his dispatch was ambushed and killed. Nevertheless, Ming forces under Ma Gui and Dong Yiyuan were sent out to deal with the Mongol chieftain Bushugtu. Except for one loss, the Ming were able to drive away the Mongols.

The city was flooded and by 6 September, the water around the city walls was nine feet deep. The situation within the city was desperate. Officers were eating horses while commoners ate tree bark. On 7 September a section of the dike southeast of the city collapsed and the rebels attempted to escape in boats, but were repelled. Mei Guozhen called for their surrender on 17 September but received no response. On 25 September the rebels bombarded the Ming forces from atop the city walls while Mongol leader Jorightu attacked from the north with a force of 18,000. Li Rusong and Ma Gui repelled the Mongols in an encircling maneuver.

By 12 October the north wall had collapsed under the water and Ming soldiers were able to take the south wall. Seeing this, the rebel leaders fell upon themselves in hopes of clemency. Bo Cheng'en surrendered while Pubei committed suicide through self-immolation.

Aftermath
Li Rusong was promoted to supreme commander, Ye Mengxiong became censor in chief of the right, and Xiao Ruxun became vice commissioner in chief. Li Rusong was then hurried to Korea to defend it from the Japanese.

Wei Xueceng was released from prison and restored to his official rank, but he died at home in obscurity.

References

Bibliography
 .

Battles involving the Ming dynasty
Conflicts in 1592